The 2018 BRICS U-17 Football Cup is the second edition of the BRICS U-17 Football Cup. It took place under the 2018 BRICS Games in Johannesburg, South Africa during the 10th BRICS summit which was held in South Africa.  It had begun on 18 July and concluded with the final on 22 July. The tournament featured the women's under-17 teams of all five members of BRICS making it first women's under 17 tournament between BRICS nation. Brazil topped the group and win the tournament on basis of match points as it was organised as league tournament. This was Brazil second BRICS cup title as they had also won men's edition in 2016.

Teams

Venues
The tournament held at Wits Rugby Stadium in Johannesburg, South Africa.

Format
All five teams in the tournament played each other in a round-robin once.

Group stage

Table

Fixtures & results

References

Brics
Brics
International association football competitions hosted by South Africa
BRICS
2018 in South African sport